Nargélis Statia Pieter (born 25 April 1997) is a Dutch athlete. She competed in the women's 4 × 100 metres relay event at the 2019 World Athletics Championships.

References

External links

1997 births
Living people
Dutch female sprinters
Place of birth missing (living people)
World Athletics Championships athletes for the Netherlands